John Robert Evans  (1 October 1929 – 13 February 2015) was a Canadian cardiologist, academic, businessperson, and civic leader.

He was the founding dean of the McMaster University Medical School and then vice-president of Health Services at McMaster University from 1965 to 1972. From 1972 to 1978 he was President of the University of Toronto. From 1979 to 1983, he served as founding Director of the Population, Health and Nutrition Department of the World Bank in Washington, DC.

Evans was a key player in the sale of the Canadian Connaught Laboratories to the French Sanofi-Aventis.

He was elected as the ninth Chairman of the Rockefeller Foundation, a position that he held from 1987 to 1995. Evans was the first Canadian to hold the position.

He was chairman of Allelix Biopharmaceuticals Inc., Torstar Corporation, Alcan Aluminum Ltd. (1995–2002), the Canada Foundation for Innovation and the Walter and Duncan Gordon Charitable Foundation. He was the chairman of and helped create the MaRS Discovery District in Toronto. He died at the age of 85 from Parkinson's disease in 2015.

Early life and education
Evans was born in Toronto, and was the youngest of seven children. His parents were Mary and William Watson Evans. Evans was orphaned at the age of nine and was subsequently raised by his older siblings. He went to the University of Toronto Schools for high school, and after graduating from UTS, studied medicine at the University of Toronto (U of T). He was a varsity football player at U of T and would later become a member of U of T's Sports Hall of Fame. He received his medical degree from the University of Toronto in 1952 and was a Rhodes Scholar at University College, Oxford. He received his Doctoral degree specializing in internal medicine and cardiology at Oxford University in 1955.

Academic career
Evans was a research fellow at Harvard Medical School from 1960–61, he then returned to Toronto as an associate professor at U of T's faculty of medicine. He also worked as a cardiologist at Toronto General Hospital during this period, apparently the only time that he practised medicine.

At the relatively young age of 35, Evans was selected as the founding Dean of McMaster University's new Medical School.

Politics
In a 1978 federal by-election, Evans ran for a seat in the House of Commons as a Liberal in the Toronto riding of Rosedale, but was defeated by former Toronto Mayor David Crombie.

Honours and awards
 2007 – He was awarded the Henry G. Friesen International Prize in Health Research
 2005 – He was inducted into the Canadian Business Hall of Fame
 2000 – He was inducted into the Canadian Medical Hall of Fame
 1992 – He was awarded the Gairdner Foundation Wightman Award
 1991 – He was made an Honorary Fellow of University College, Oxford
 1991 – He was made a member of the Order of Ontario
 1978 – He was made a Companion of the Order of Canada

Honorary degrees 
Evans received 15 Honorary Doctorates, including:

  1972: Dalhousie University, Doctor of Laws (LLD)
  1972: McMaster University, Doctor of Laws (LLD)
  1972: York University, Doctor of Laws (LLD)
  1973: Memorial University of Newfoundland, Doctor of Science, (DSc)
  1974: Queen's University, Doctor of Laws (LLD)
  1975: Wilfrid Laurier University, Doctor of Laws (LLD)
  1978: Yale University, Doctor of Laws (LLD)
  1978: Johns Hopkins University, Doctor of Humane Letters (LHD)
  1980: University of Toronto, Doctor of Laws (LLD), honoured for "Service to the University"
  1981: Maastricht University, honored for "Education innovation"
  1996: University of Calgary, Doctor of Laws (LLD)
  2005: University of Alberta, Doctor of Science, (DSc)
  2009: Lakehead University, Doctor of Science, (DSc)

References

External links
 Canadian Who's Who 1997 entry
 Archives of Hamilton Health Sciences
John Robert Evans archival papers held at the University of Toronto Archives and Records Management Services

1929 births
2015 deaths
Alumni of University College, Oxford
Businesspeople from Toronto
Canadian corporate directors
Canadian cardiologists
Canadian Rhodes Scholars
Canadian university and college faculty deans
20th-century Canadian businesspeople
Companions of the Order of Canada
Liberal Party of Canada candidates for the Canadian House of Commons
Members of the Order of Ontario
Presidents of the University of Toronto
University of Toronto alumni
Members of the National Academy of Medicine